The Friedrichshafen FF.34 was a German biplane floatplane of the 1910s produced by Flugzeugbau Friedrichshafen.

Development and design
The FF.34 was similar to the earlier FF.31 as it was a pusher configuration twin-boom floatplane. It had a central nacelle with two open cockpits. The engine (a Maybach Mb.IV) with a pusher propeller was mounted at the back of the nacelle. The twin tail booms were fitted to a rear tailplane/elevator assembly. The aircraft was later modified with a conventional fuselage and tail unit and re-designated the FF.44

Variants
FF.34
Prototype twin-boom pusher floatplane.
FF.44
FF.34 converted with a conventional fuselage and tail unit.

Operators

Imperial German Navy

Specifications (FF.34)

See also

References

Bibliography

Further reading

1910s German military reconnaissance aircraft
Floatplanes
Biplanes
Single-engined pusher aircraft
FF.34
Twin-boom aircraft
Aircraft first flown in 1916